Shin Il-soo (born 4 September 1994) is a South Korean footballer who plays as midfielder for Ansan Greeners FC.

Career
Shin Il-soo was selected by Seoul E-Land in 2015 K League draft.

On 23 August 2017, Shin Il-soo signed with the LigaPro side Varzim.

References

External links 
 

1993 births
Living people
Association football midfielders
South Korean footballers
South Korean expatriate footballers
Seoul E-Land FC players
Ansan Greeners FC players
K League 2 players
Korea University alumni
South Korea under-23 international footballers
Expatriate footballers in Portugal
South Korean expatriate sportspeople in Portugal